Like It Never Was Before is a 1995 Danish / Swedish drama film directed by Susanne Bier, and written by Jonas Gardell.

Cast 
 Loa Falkman - Rune Runeberg
 Stina Ekblad - Gunnel Runeberg
 Simon Norrthon - Petrus
 Philip Zandén - superintendent
 Sif Ruud - Evelyn
 Ghita Nørby - Hjördis
 Ingvar Hirdwall - strange man
 Ulla Skoog - beach tennis woman
 Per Sandberg - beach tennis man
  - Mona
 Claire Wikholm - Britt Dagerman
 Per Eggers - Bertil Dagerman
 Jakob Eklund - Harry
 Bengt Blomgren - Runeberg's boss

References

External links 

1995 drama films
1995 films
Films directed by Susanne Bier
Danish drama films
Swedish drama films
1990s Swedish films